Charing Cross station may refer to:

In London, England:
Charing Cross railway station 
Charing Cross tube station (on the London Underground)
Embankment tube station was previously named Charing Cross

In Glasgow, Scotland:
Charing Cross (Glasgow) railway station